"I Want to Make the World Turn Around" is a single from Steve Miller Band's album Living in the 20th Century, released in November 1986. It reached number 97 on the Billboard Hot 100 and number one on the Album Rock Tracks chart, where it stayed for six straight weeks. In Australia, it peaked at No. 72 on the Kent Music Report.

The sax solo is performed by jazz-pop saxophonist, Kenny G.

References

1986 songs
1986 singles
Steve Miller Band songs
Capitol Records singles
Song recordings produced by Steve Miller
Songs written by Steve Miller (musician)